The Honor of Rameriz (often incorrectly referred to with the correct spelling of 'Ramirez': The Honor of Ramirez) is a 1921 American silent short Western film produced by Cyrus J. Williams and distributed by Pathé Exchange. It was directed by Robert North Bradbury and stars Tom Santschi, Bessie Love, and Ruth Stonehouse.

This short film was part of the "Santschi Series", which included the other short films The Spirit of the Lake, The Heart of Doreon, Lorraine of the Timberlands, and Mother o' Dreams, all of which starred Santschi.

The film is presumed lost.

Plot 
Near the Mexico–United States border, when a woman's (Love) gold is stolen by a thief (Hearn), the woman seeks help from Rameriz (Santschi). Rameriz's jealous wife (Stonehouse) and the woman's geologist husband (Morley) assume that the woman and Rameriz are having an affair. In the end, the gold is returned and the honor of Rameriz is restored.

Cast 
 Tom Santschi as Rameriz
 Bessie Love as the Geologist's Wife
 Ruth Stonehouse as the Wife of Rameriz
 Eddie Hearn as the Thief
 Thomas Lingham
 Jay Morley as the Geologist

Production 
Some outdoor scenes were filmed at Keen's Camp in Riverside County.

References

External links 

 
 Still of Bessie Love and Tom Santschi from the film
 Lobby card featuring Eddie Hearn and Santschi

1921 films
1921 Western (genre) films
1921 lost films
American black-and-white films
Lost American films
Lost Western (genre) films
Silent American Western (genre) films
1920s American films